Yang Man (born 2 November 1995) is a Chinese footballer who participated in the 2016 Summer Olympics.

International goals

References

Chinese women's footballers
China women's international footballers
1995 births
Living people
Footballers at the 2016 Summer Olympics
Olympic footballers of China
Women's association football midfielders
Footballers at the 2020 Summer Olympics